Sunshine State may refer to:

Places with the nickname
Queensland, Australia
Ondo State, Nigeria
Florida, US (official)
South Dakota, US (unofficial)

Arts and entertainment
Sunshine State (film), a 2002 American film by John Sayles
"The Sunshine State" (Prison Break), a 2008 TV episode
Sunshine State, a webcomic by Graham Nolan
Sunshine State, a 2021 EP, or the title song, by Pixey
"The Sunshine State", a 2012 song by Farrah Abraham from My Teenage Dream Ended

Other uses
Florida's Turnpike, originally the Sunshine State Parkway, a toll road in Florida, US
Sunshine State Conference, an American college athletic conference